Spruce Township may refer to the following townships in the United States:

 Spruce Township, Bates County, Missouri
 Spruce Township, Roseau County, Minnesota

See also
 Spruce Creek Township, Huntingdon County, Pennsylvania
 Spruce Grove Township, Minnesota (disambiguation)
 Spruce Hill Township (disambiguation)
 Spruce Valley Township, Marshall County, Minnesota